The 13th season of Taniec z Gwiazdami, the Polish edition of Dancing with the Stars, started on 4 September 2011 and ended in November 2011. It was broadcast by TVN. Piotr Gąsowski and Natasza Urbańska were the hosts. The judges were: Iwona Szymańska-Pavlović, Piotr Galiński and, replacing Beata Tyszkiewicz and Zbigniew Wodecki, were Jolanta Fraszyńska and Janusz Józefowicz.

Couples

Scores

Red numbers indicate the lowest score for each week.
Green numbers indicate the highest score for each week.
 indicates the couple eliminated that week.
 indicates the returning couple that finished in the bottom two.
 indicates the winning couple of the week.
 indicates the runner-up of the week.
 indicates the third place couple of the week.

Notes:

Week 1: Kacper Kuszewski scored 35 out of 40 for his cha-cha-cha, making it the highest score in this episode. There was a record in this episode: Zbigniew Urbański got the lowest score in the history of the show, scoring 13 out of 40 for his cha-cha-cha. It was also the lowest score ever for cha-cha-cha. He was eliminated.

Week 2: Anna Wendzikoska scored 36 out of 40 for her rumba, making it the highest score in this episode. Jagna Marczułajtis-Walczak got 19 points for her quickstep, making it the lowest score of the week. Marta & Przemysław were eliminated despite being 12 points from the bottom.

Week 3: Kacper Kuszewski and Katarzyna Zielińsska scored 38 out of 40 for their tango, making it the highest score in this episode. Aleksandra Kisio got 16 points for her tango, making it the lowest score of the week. It was also the lowest score ever for the tango. Kazimierz & Bianka were eliminated despite being 7 points from the bottom.

Week 4: Bilguun Ariunbaatar received the first perfect score of the season for his foxtrot. There was a three-way tie for second place, with Dariusz Kordek, Katarzyna Zielińska and Kacper Kuszewski all getting 39 out of 40. Aleksandra Kisio and Michał Szpak got 26 points for their Paso Doble, making it the lowest score of the week. Stanisław & Magdalena were eliminated despite being 5 points from the bottom.

Week 5: Katarzyna Zielińska scored 37 out of 40 for her Viennese Waltz, making it the highest score in this episode. Jagna Marczułajtis-Walczak got 21 points for her samba, making it the lowest score of the week. Anna & Michał were eliminated despite being 11 points from the bottom.

Week 6: Katarzyna Pakosińska received her first perfect score for waltz in American Smooth. Aleksandra Kisio got 18 points for her salsa, making it the lowest score of the week. Dariusz & Blanka were eliminated despite being 13 points from the bottom.

Week 7:  All couples danced to songs from famous movies about crime. Kacper Kuszewski received the first perfect score of the season for his jive. Michał Szpak got 25 points for his foxtrot, making it the lowest score of the week. Aleksandra & Łukasz were eliminated despite being 5 points from the bottom.

Week 8:  All couples danced to songs from 1920s & 1930s movies. Bilguun Ariunbaatar received his second perfect score for the tango. Jagna Marczułajtis-Walczak got 26 points for her cha-cha-cha, making it the lowest score of the week. Jagna & Krzysztof were eliminated.

Week 9: All couples danced to the most famous pop songs. There was a record in this episode: Michał Szpak got the lowest score in the history of the show, scoring 13 out of 40 for his jive. It was also the lowest score ever for jive. Zbigniew Urbański also got 13 points for his cha-cha-cha in Week 1 Season 13. Kacper Kuszewski scored 36 out of 40 for his rumba, making it the highest Week 9 score in this episode. Katarzyna & Stefano were eliminated despite being 21 points from the bottom.

Week 10: Michał Szpak got the lowest score in the history of the show, scoring 13 out of 40 for his quickstep. He also got 13 points for his jive in Week 10. It was also the lowest score ever for quickstep. Weronika Marczuk received the first perfect score of the season for her rumba. Bilguun Ariunbaatar received his third perfect score for the samba. Michał & Paulina were eliminated.

Week 11: Bilguun Ariunbaatar received his 4th perfect score for the waltz. Katarzyna & Rafał were eliminated.

Week 12: Bilguun Ariunbaatar received his 5th perfect score for the Argentine tango. Bilguun Ariunbaatar was in the bottom two for the first time in the competition. Weronika & Jan were eliminated. That was the 3rd time when Jan Kliment finished at 3rd place (also in Season 11 with Katarzyna Grochola and in Season 12 with Edyta Górniak).

Week 13: Bilguun Ariunbaatar got 120 out of 120 points.  Both couples had to perform three dances: their favorite Latin dance, their favorite ballroom dance and a freestyle. There was a record in this episode: Kacper Kuszewski got the lowest score in history of the finale of the show, scoring 30 out of 40 for his Viennese Waltz. Kacper & Anna won the competition, having cast 52.68 percent of the votes. This is the second time the season's winner was second place on the judges' general scoreboard and the 7th time the winner was not first place according to the judges' scoreboard. Kacper Kuszewski became the 4th man in history to win the program since Krzysztof Tyniec won Season 5 of the show. For the third time in the history of the program in the final there were two men (also in Season 5 and Season 1).

Guest performances

Averages

Couples' highest and lowest scoring dances

Highest and lowest scoring performances
The best and worst performances in each dance according to the judges' marks are as follows:

Episodes
Unless indicated otherwise, individual judges' scores in the charts below (given in parentheses) are listed in this order from left to right: Iwona Szymańska-Pavlović, Janusz Józefowicz, Jolanta Fraszyńska and Piotr Galiński.

Week 1

Running order

Week 2

Running order

Week 3

Running order

Week 4

Running order

Week 5

Running order

Week 6

Running order

Week 7: Criminal Movies Theme Week

Running order

Week 8: 20s and 30s Movies Theme Week

Running order

Week 9: Female Pop Singers Week

Running order

Week 10

Running order

Week 11

Running order

Week 12

Running order

Week 13: Final

Running order

Other dances

Dance schedule
The celebrities and professional partners danced one of these routines for each corresponding week.
 Week 1: Cha-cha-cha or waltz (men) & group salsa (women)
 Week 2: Rumba or quickstep (women) & group swing (men)
 Week 3: Jive or tango
 Week 4: Paso Doble or foxtrot
 Week 5: Samba or Viennese Waltz
 Week 6: Salsa or an unlearned ballroom dance in American Smooth style
 Week 7: One unlearned dance (crime film week)
 Week 8: One unlearned dance & group foxtrot (1920s & 1930s movies week)
 Week 9: One unlearned Latin dance & Group Viennese Waltz (contemporary pop music week)
 Week 10: One unlearned ballroom dance & one repeated Latin dance
 Week 11: One unlearned dance & one repeated dance
 Week 12: Argentine tango & one repeated Latin dance
 Week 13: Favorite Latin dance, favorite ballroom dance & freestyle

Dance chart

 Highest scoring dance
 Lowest scoring dance
 Performed, but not scored

Weekly results
The order is based on the judges' scores combined with the viewers' votes.

 This couple came in first place with the judges.
 This couple came in first place with the judges and gained the highest number of viewers' votes.
 This couple gained the highest number of viewers' votes.
 This couple came in last place with the judges and gained the highest number of viewers' votes.
 This couple came in last place with the judges.
 This couple came in last place with the judges and was eliminated.
 This couple was eliminated.
 This couple won the competition.
 This couple came in second in the competition.
 This couple came in third in the competition.

Audience voting results
The percentage of votes cast by a couple in a particular week is given in parentheses.

Ratings

References

External links
 Official site – Taniec z gwiazdami
 Taniec z gwiazdami on Polish Wikipedia

Season 13
2011 Polish television seasons